The  'Ndrangheta is a prominent Italian Mafia-type organized crime syndicate based in the peninsular and mountainous region of Calabria and dating back to the late 18th century. It is considered one of the most powerful organized crime groups in the world.
Since the 1950s, following wide-scale emigration from Calabria, the organization has established itself worldwide. It is characterized by a horizontal structure made up of autonomous clans known as ndrine, based almost exclusively on blood ties. Its main activity is drug trafficking, on which it has a near monopoly in Europe, but it also deals with arms trafficking, money laundering, racketeering, extortion, loan sharking, and prostitution.

The 'Ndrangheta has enjoyed for decades a privileged relationship with the main South American cartels, which consider it their most reliable European partner. It is capable of heavily influencing local and national politics and infiltrating large sectors of the legal economy. In 2013 they purportedly made € 53 billion, according to a study from Demoskopika Research Institute. A US diplomat estimated that the organization's drug trafficking, extortion and money laundering activities accounted for at least three percent of Italy's GDP in 2010.

 History 

Origin and etymology
The 'Ndrangheta was already known during the reign of the Bourbons of Naples. In the spring of 1792, there was the first official report in history on the 'Ndrangheta, and a mission as "Royal Visitor" was entrusted to Giuseppe Maria Galanti; these travelled far and wide throughout most of Calabria, often also making use of reports (answers written on the basis of a sort of questionnaire to fixed questions, prepared by himself) of local notables deemed reliable and trusted. This resulted in a bleak picture, as well as on the economic situation in the region, especially on that of public order. This work has been analyzed by various contemporary historians. Luca Addante writes in the introduction to the re-edition of Galanti's report ("Giornale di viaggio in Calabria", Rubbettino Editore, 2008): "the murders, thefts, the kidnappings were infinite; the ignorance of the clergy was scandalous; the village notables, obsessed with the idea of enriching themselves and then ennobling themselves, rapacious monopolizers of local administrations, who grew up in the shadow of a decadent nobility whose remains were being prepared." Galanti, in particular, reports in the Giornale the descriptions of disturbing crime phenomena, noting how the inefficient administration of justice, the corruption and the monopoly of the barons, was starting to produce cases, as in Maida, of "a small bunch of young, freeloaded young men who commit violence with the use of firearms. Justice is idle because without force and without a system malicious people become policemen (a sort of urban guard)." In the District of Gerace, "the raids of the criminals in the countryside are general. Almost all the militiamen are the most troublemakers in the province because the criminals and the debtors adopt this profession and are guaranteed by commanders in contempt of the laws. With this, the crimes, which grow every day".

In 1861, the prefect of Reggio Calabria already noticed the presence of so-called camorristi, a term used at the time since there was no formal name for the phenomenon in Calabria (the Camorra was the older and better known criminal organization in Naples).Behan, The Camorra, pp. 9–10 Since the 1880s, there is ample evidence of 'Ndrangheta-type groups in police reports and sentences by local courts. At the time they were often being referred to as the picciotteria, onorata società (honoured society) or camorra and mafia. These secret societies in the areas of Calabria rich in olives and vines were distinct from the often anarchic forms of banditry and were organized hierarchically with a code of conduct that included omertà – the code of silence – according to a sentence from the court in Reggio Calabria in 1890. An 1897 sentence from the court in Palmi mentioned a written code of rules found in the village of Seminara based on honour, secrecy, violence, solidarity (often based on blood relationships) and mutual assistance.

In the folk culture surrounding 'Ndrangheta in Calabria, references to the Spanish Garduña often appear. Aside from these references, however, there is nothing to substantiate a link between the two organizations. The Calabrian word 'Ndrangheta derives from Greek ἀνδραγαθία andragathía for "heroism" and manly "virtue" or ἀνδράγαθος andrágathos, compound words of ἀνήρ, anḗr (gen. ἀνδρóς, andrós), i.e. man, and ἀγαθός, agathós, i.e. good, brave, meaning a courageous man. In many areas of Calabria the verb '''ndranghitiari, from the Greek verb andragathízesthai, means "to engage in a defiant and valiant attitude". The word 'Ndrangheta was brought to a wider audience by the Calabrian writer Corrado Alvaro in the Corriere della Sera in September 1955.Fabio Truzzolillo, "The 'Ndrangheta: the current state of historical research," Modern Italy (August 2011) 16#3, pp. 363–383.

Modern history
Until 1975, the 'Ndrangheta restricted their Italian operations to Calabria, mainly involved in extortion and blackmail. Their involvement in cigarette contraband expanded their scope and contacts with the Sicilian Mafia and the Neapolitan Camorra. With the arrival of large public works in Calabria, skimming of public contracts became an important source of income. Disagreements over how to distribute the spoils led to the First 'Ndrangheta war killing 233 people. The prevailing factions began to kidnap rich people located in northern Italy for ransom. A high-profile case was the 1973 kidnapping of John Paul Getty III, who had his severed ear mailed to a newspaper in November, and later released in December following the negotiated payment of $2.2 million by Getty's grandfather, J. Paul Getty.  There were reportedly more than 200 abductions between the 1970s and mid-1990s acredited to the 'Ndrangheta.

The Second 'Ndrangheta war raged from 1985 to 1991. The bloody six-year war between the Condello-Imerti-Serraino-Rosmini clans and the De Stefano-Tegano-Libri-Latella clans led to more than 600 deaths. "Condello, leader pacato e spietato" , La Repubblica, 19 February 2008. The Sicilian Mafia contributed to the end of the conflict and probably suggested the subsequent set up of a superordinate body, called La Provincia, to avoid further infighting.

In 1996, the Solntsevskaya Bratva of the Russian Mafia, who are very close to Vietnamese narcotics traffickers in Moscow and the Cali Cartel, supported the 'Ndrangheta. The mayor of Moscow in the late 1990s Yuri Luzhkov gave support to these groups as well. The Solntsevskaya mafia have close links to the FSB and control the territory around the FSB Academy in Moscow. The Tambovskaya Bratva, who are very closely associated with the political rise of Vladimir Putin, support the Solntsevsksya mafia. In the 1990s, the organization started to invest in the illegal international drug trade, mainly importing cocaine from Colombia.

Deputy President of the regional parliament of Calabria Francesco Fortugno was killed by the 'Ndrangheta on 16 October 2005 in Locri. Demonstrations against the organization then ensued, with young protesters carrying banderoles reading "Ammazzateci tutti!", Italian for "Kill us all". The national government started a large-scale enforcement operation in Calabria and arrested numerous 'ndranghetisti including the murderers of Fortugno.

The 'Ndrangheta has expanded its activities to Northern Italy, mainly to sell drugs and to invest in legal businesses which could be used for money laundering. In May 2007 twenty members of 'Ndrangheta were arrested in Milan. On 30 August 2007, hundreds of police raided the town of San Luca, the focal point of the bitter San Luca feud between rival clans among the 'Ndrangheta. Over 30 men and women, linked to the killing of six Italian men in Germany, were arrested.

Since 30 March 2010, the 'Ndrangheta has been considered an organisation of mafia-type association according to 416 bis under the Italian penal code.

In March 2011, the Ndrangheta expanded into northern Italy due to their "unlimited financial resources" according to the Italian Anti-Mafia Commission.

On 4 June 2012, numerous arrests in Spain, Croatia, Slovenia, Italy, the Netherlands, Bulgaria, and Finland were made following the Milan District Anti-Mafia Prosecutor's Office investigation into several Switzerland bank accounts and a fleet of ships that supported cocaine shipped to Europe from Venezuela, Argentina, and the Dominican Republic.

On 9 October 2012, following a months-long investigation by the central government, the City Council of Reggio Calabria headed by Mayor  was dissolved for alleged ties to the group. Arena and all the 30 city councilors were sacked to prevent any "mafia contagion" in the local government."Il Viminale scioglie per mafia il comune di Reggio Calabria" , La Repubblica, 9 October 2012.
This was the first time a government of a capital of a provincial government was dismissed. Three central government-appointed administrators will govern the city for 18 months until new elections. The move came after unnamed councilors were suspected of having ties to the 'Ndrangheta under the 10-year centre-right rule of Mayor Giuseppe Scopelliti.

'Ndrangheta infiltration of political offices is not limited to Calabria. On 10 October 2012, the commissioner of Milan's regional government in charge of public housing, Domenico Zambetti of People of Freedom (PDL), was arrested on accusations he paid the 'Ndrangheta in exchange for an election victory and to extort favours and contracts from the housing official, including construction tenders for the World Expo 2015 in Milan. The probe of alleged vote-buying underscores the infiltration of the 'Ndrangheta in the political machine of Italy's affluent northern Lombardy region. Zambetti's arrest marked the biggest case of 'Ndrangheta infiltration so far uncovered in northern Italy and prompted calls for Lombardy governor Roberto Formigoni to resign."Formigoni's Cabinet Member Arrested for Election Fraud" , Corriere della Sera, 10 October 2012.

In 2014, in the American FBI and Italian police joint operation New Bridge, members of both the American Gambino and Bonanno families were arrested, as well as ten members of the Ursino clan. Raffaele Valente was among the arrested. In Italian wiretaps, he revealed that he had set up a faction of the Ursino 'Ndrangheta in New York City. Valente was convicted for attempting to sell a sawn-off shotgun and a silencer to an undercover FBI agent for $5000 at a bakery in Brooklyn. He was sentenced to three years and one month in prison. Gambino associate Franco Lupoi and his father-in-law, Nicola Antonio Simonetta, were described as the linchpins of the operation. International organizations like INTERPOL have also engaged in operations against the 'Ndrangheta, specifically in their launch of INTERPOL's Cooperation Against 'Ndrangheta (ICAN). In June 2014, Pope Francis denounced the 'Ndrangheta for their "adoration of evil and contempt of the common good" and vowed that the Church would help tackle organized crime, saying that Mafiosi were excommunicated. A spokesperson for the Vatican clarified that the pope's words did not constitute a formal excommunication under canon law, as a period of legal process is required beforehand.

On 12 December 2017, 48 members of 'Ndrangheta were arrested for mafia association, extortion, criminal damage, fraudulent transferral of assets and illegal possession of firearms. Out of the 48 arrested, four were forced to house arrest and 44 were ordered to jail detention. Two-time mayor of Taurianova, Calabria and his former cabinet member were among the indicted. It was alleged by investigators that the Calabrian clans had infiltrated construction of public works, control of real estate brokerage, food fields, greenhouse production and renewable energy.

According to some reports, the 'Ndrangheta works in conjunction with Mexican drug cartels in the drug trade, such as with the mercenary army known as Los Zetas.

On 9 January 2018, law enforcement in Italy and Germany arrested 169 people in connection with the 'Ndrangheta mafia, specifically the Farao and Marincola clans based in Calabria. Assets worth € 50 million (£44/$59m) were seized. The indictment mentions that owners of German restaurants, ice cream parlours, hotels and pizzerias were forced to buy wine, pizza dough, pastries and other products made in southern Italy. The Farao clan was being led by life-imprisoned Giuseppe Farao, before the arrests, and was passing orders onto his sons. They controlled bakeries, vineyards, olive groves, funeral homes, launderettes, plastic recycling plants and shipyards. The waste disposal of the Ilva steel company based in Taranto was also infiltrated. Some of the charges were mafia association, attempted murder, money laundering, extortion and illegal weapons possession and trafficking. Italian prosecutor Nicola Gratteri said that the arrests were the most important step taken against the 'Ndrangehta in the past 20 years. Eleven suspects were detained, and accused of blackmailing and money laundering. They were deported back to Italy. Alessandro Figliomeni, former Mayor of Siderno, Calabria, was sentenced to 12 years in prison on 7 May 2018. He is alleged to be a member of the Commisso 'ndrina clan and served in the top hierarchy.

In December 2019, more than 300 people were arrested in Calabria on suspicion of belonging to the 'Ndrangheta in an operation involving 2,500 police. The arrests were said by Nicola Gratteri, the chief prosecutor in Catanzaro, to be the second largest in number in the history of Italian organised crime, after those that led to the so-called "Maxi Trial" of Sicilian Mafia bosses in Palermo between 1986 and 1992. The trial against the more than 300 'Ndrangheta members began on 13 January 2021.

 Characteristics 
Italian anti-organized crime agencies estimated in 2007 that the 'Ndrangheta has an annual revenue of about € 35–40 billion (US$35–40 billion), which amounts to approximately 3.5% of the GDP of Italy."Mafiosi move north to take over the shops and cafés of Milan" , The Times, 5 May 2007. This comes mostly from illegal drug trafficking, but also from ostensibly legal businesses such as construction, restaurants and supermarkets. The 'Ndrangheta has a strong grip on the economy and governance in Calabria. According to a US Embassy cable leaked by WikiLeaks, the 'Ndrangheta controls huge segments of its territory and economy, and accounts for at least three percent of Italy's GDP through drug trafficking, extortion, skimming of public contracts, and usury."Italy's Brutal Export: The Mafia Goes Global" , Time, 9 March 2011.

The principal difference with the Mafia is in recruitment methods. The 'Ndrangheta recruits members on the criterion of blood relationships resulting in an extraordinary cohesion within the family clan that presents a major obstacle to investigation. Sons of ndranghetisti are expected to follow in their fathers' footsteps, and go through a grooming process in their youth to become giovani d'onore (boys of honour) before they eventually enter the ranks as uomini d'onore (men of honour). There are relatively few Calabrian mafiosi who have opted out to become a pentito; at the end of 2002, there were 157 Calabrian witnesses in the state witness protection program. Unlike the Sicilian Mafia in the early 1990s, they have meticulously avoided a head-on confrontation with the Italian state.

Prosecution in Calabria is hindered by the fact that Italian judges and prosecutors who score highly in exams get to choose their posting; those who are forced to work in Calabria will usually request to be transferred right away. With weak government presence and corrupt officials, few civilians are willing to speak out against the organization.

 Structure 

 Organizational structure 

Both the Sicilian Cosa Nostra and the 'Ndrangheta are loose confederations of about one hundred organised groups, also called "cosche" or families, each of which claims sovereignty over a territory, usually a town or village, though without ever fully conquering and legitimizing its monopoly of violence.

There are approximately 100 of these families, totaling between 4,000 and 5,000 members in Reggio Calabria.Paoli, Mafia Brotherhoods, p. 32. Other estimates mention 6,000–7,000 men; worldwide there might be some 10,000 members.

Most of the groups (86) operate in the Province of Reggio Calabria, although a portion of the recorded 70 criminal groups based in the Calabrian provinces Catanzaro and Cosenza also appear to be formally affiliated with the 'Ndrangheta. The families are concentrated in poor villages in Calabria such as Platì, Locri, San Luca, Africo and Altomonte as well as the main city and provincial capital Reggio Calabria. San Luca is considered to be the stronghold of the 'Ndrangheta. According to a former 'ndranghetista, "almost all the male inhabitants belong to the 'Ndrangheta, and the Sanctuary of Polsi has long been the meeting place of the affiliates." Bosses from outside Calabria, from as far as Canada and Australia, regularly attend the meetings at the Sanctuary of Polsi, an indication that the 'ndrine around the world perceive themselves as being part of the same collective entity.

The basic local organizational unit of the 'Ndrangheta is called a locale (local or place) with jurisdiction over an entire town or an area in a large urban center. A locale may have branches, called  'ndrina (plural:  'ndrine), in the districts of the same city, in neighbouring towns and villages, or even outside Calabria, in cities and towns in the industrial North of Italy in and around Turin and Milan: for example, Bardonecchia, an alpine town in the province of Turin in Piedmont, has been, the first municipality in northern Italy dissolved for alleged mafia infiltration, with the arrest of the historical 'Ndrangheta boss of the city, Rocco Lo Presti. The small towns of Corsico and Buccinasco in Lombardy are considered to be strongholds of the 'Ndrangheta. Sometimes sotto 'ndrine are established. These subunits enjoy a high degree of autonomy – they have a leader and independent staff. In some contexts the  'ndrine have become more powerful than the locale on which they formally depend. Other observers maintain that the  'ndrina is the basic organizational unit. Each  'ndrina is "autonomous on its territory and no formal authority stands above the " 'ndrina boss", according to the Antimafia Commission. The  'ndrina is usually in control of a small town or a neighborhood. If more than one  'ndrina operates in the same town, they form a locale.

Blood family and membership of the crime family overlap to a great extent within the 'Ndrangheta. By and large, the  'ndrine consist of men belonging to the same family lineage. Salvatore Boemi, anti-mafia prosecutor in Reggio Calabria, told the Italian Antimafia Commission that "one becomes a member for the simple fact of being born in a mafia family," although other reasons might attract a young man to seek membership, and non-kin have also been admitted. Marriages help cement relations within each  'ndrina and to expand membership. As a result, a few blood families constitute each group, hence "a high number of people with the same last name often end up being prosecuted for membership of a given  'ndrina." Indeed, since there is no limit to the membership of a single unit, bosses try to maximize descendants.

At the bottom of the chain of command are the picciotti d'onore or soldiers, who are expected to perform tasks with blind obedience until they are promoted to the next level of cammorista, where they will be granted command over their own group of soldiers. The next level, separated by the  'ndrina but part of 'Ndrangheta, is known as santista and higher still is the vangelista, upon which the up-and-coming gangster has to swear their dedication to a life of crime on the Bible. The Quintino, also called Padrino, is the second-highest level of command in a 'Ndrangheta clan (name Ndrina), being made up of five privileged members of the crime family who report directly to the boss, the capobastone (head of command).

 Power structure 
For many years, the power apparatus of the single families were the sole ruling bodies within the two associations, and they have remained the real centres of power even after superordinate bodies were created in the Cosa Nostra beginning in the 1950s (the Sicilian Mafia Commission) and in the 'Ndrangheta a superordinate body was created only in 1991 as the result of negotiations to end years of inter-family violence. However, the absolute autonomy of Calabrian crime families prior to this is not supported by historical evidence. At least since the end of the 19th century, some stable mechanisms for coordination and dispute settlement have existed. Contacts and meetings among the bosses of the locali were frequent.

A new investigation, known as Operation Crimine, which ended in July 2010 with an arrest of 305 'Ndrangheta members revealed that the 'Ndrangheta was extremely "hierarchical, united and pyramidal," and not just clan-based as previously believed, as said by Italy's chief anti-mafia prosecutor Pietro Grasso.

At least since the 1950s, the chiefs of the 'Ndrangheta locali have met regularly near the Sanctuary of Our Lady of Polsi in the municipality of San Luca during the September Feast. These annual meetings, known as the crimine, have traditionally served as a forum to discuss future strategies and settle disputes among the locali. The assembly exercises weak supervisory powers over the activities of all 'Ndrangheta groups. Strong emphasis was placed on the temporary character of the position of the crimine boss. A new representative was elected at each meeting. Far from being the "boss of bosses," the capo crimine actually has comparatively little authority to interfere in family feuds or to control the level of interfamily violence.

At these meetings, every boss "must give account of all the activities carried out during the year and of all the most important facts taking place in his territory such as kidnappings, homicides, etc." The historical preeminence of the San Luca family is such that every new group or locale must obtain its authorization to operate and every group belonging to the 'Ndrangheta, "still has to deposit a small percentage of illicit proceeds to the principale of San Luca in recognition of the latter's primordial supremacy."

Security concerns have led to the creation in the 'Ndrangheta of a secret society within the secret society: La Santa. Membership in the Santa is known only to other members. Contrary to the code, it allowed bosses to establish close connections with state representatives, even to the extent that some were affiliated with the Santa. These connections were often established through Freemasonry, which the santisti – breaking another rule of the traditional code – were allowed to join.Paoli, Mafia Brotherhoods, p. 116

Since the end of the Second 'Ndrangheta war in 1991, the 'Ndrangheta is ruled by a collegial body or Commission, known as La Provincia. Its primary function is the settlement of inter-family disputes. Gratteri & Nicaso, Fratelli di Sangue, pp. 65–68 The body, also referred to as the Commission in reference to its Sicilian counterpart, is composed of three lower bodies, known as mandamenti. One for the clans on the Ionic side (the Aspromonte mountains and Locride) of Calabria, a second for the Tyrrhenian side (the plains of Gioia Tauro) and one central mandamento for the city of Reggio Calabria.

An article published in July 2019 in Canada, summarized the traditional structure. "For decades, the ’Ndrangheta families of Siderno operating in Canada — about seven of them — have been governed by a board of directors, called the “camera di controllo,” or chamber of control. The local board, as in other countries around the world and other regions of Italy where clans have spread, have all been subservient to the mother clans of Calabria, under a body known as 'il Crimine di Siderno'".

By mid-2019, however, Police in both countries were convinced that "the ’Ndrangheta's Canadian presence has become so powerful and influential that the board north of Toronto has the authority to make decisions, not only in relation to Canada's underworld, but also abroad, even back in Siderno".

 Activities 
According to Italian DIA (Direzione Investigativa Antimafia, Department of the Police of Italy against organized crime) and Guardia di Finanza (Italian Financial Police and Customs Police) the "'Ndrangheta is now one of the most powerful criminal organizations in the world." Economic activities of 'Ndrangheta include international cocaine and weapons smuggling, with Italian investigators estimating that 80% of Europe's cocaine passes through the Calabrian port of Gioia Tauro and is controlled by the 'Ndrangheta. However, according to a report of the European Monitoring Centre for Drugs and Drug Addiction (EMCDDA) and Europol, the Iberian Peninsula is considered the main entry point for cocaine into Europe and a gateway to the European market. The United Nations Office on Drugs and Crime (UNODC) estimated that in 2007 nearly ten times as much cocaine was intercepted in Spain (almost 38 MT) in comparison with Italy (almost 4 MT).

'Ndrangheta groups and Sicilian Cosa Nostra groups sometimes act as joint ventures in cocaine trafficking enterprises. "Uno degli affari di Cosa Nostra e 'Ndrangheta insieme" , Notiziario Droghe, 30 May 2005.
Further activities include skimming money off large public work construction projects, money laundering and traditional crimes such as usury and extortion. 'Ndrangheta invests illegal profits in legal real estate and financial activities.

In early February 2017, the Carabinieri arrested 33 suspects in the Calabrian mafia's Piromalli 'ndrina ('Ndrangheta) which was allegedly exporting fake extra virgin olive oil to the U.S.; the product was actually inexpensive olive pomace oil fraudulently labeled. In early 2016, the American television program 60 Minutes had warned that "the olive oil business has been corrupted by the Mafia" and that "Agromafia" was $16-billion per year enterprise.

The business volume of the 'Ndrangheta is estimated at almost € 44 billion in 2007, approximately 2.9% of Italy's GDP, according to a private research institute, Eurispes (Institute of Political, Economic and Social Studies) in Italy. Drug trafficking is the most profitable activity with 62% of the total turnover.

 Outside Italy 
The 'Ndrangheta has established branches abroad, mainly through migration. The overlap of blood and mafia family seems to have helped the 'Ndrangheta expand beyond its traditional territory: "The familial bond has not only worked as a shield to protect secrets and enhance security, but also helped to maintain identity in the territory of origin and reproduce it in territories where the family has migrated."  'Ndrine are reported to be operating in northern Italy, Germany, Belgium, the Netherlands, France, the rest of Europe, the United States, Canada, and Australia. One group of 'ndranghetisti discovered outside Italy was in Ontario, Canada, several decades ago. They were dubbed the Siderno Group by Canadian judges as most of its members hailed from and around Siderno.

Magistrates in Calabria warned a few years ago about the international scale of the 'Ndrangheta's operations. It is now believed to have surpassed the traditional axis between the Sicilian and American Cosa Nostra, to become the major importer of cocaine to Europe. Outside Italy 'Ndrangheta operates in several countries, such as:

Albania
According to the German Federal Intelligence Service, the Bundesnachrichtendienst (BND), in a leaked report to a Berlin newspaper, states that the 'Ndrangheta "act in close co-operation with Albanian mafia families in moving weapons and narcotics across Europe's porous borders".

Argentina
In November 2006, a cocaine trafficking network that operated in Argentina, Spain and Italy was dismantled. The Argentinian police said the 'Ndrangheta had roots in the country and shipped cocaine through Spain to Milan and Turin. In October 2022, an Italian 'Ndrangheta mafia leader, Carmine Alfonso Maiorano, who was responsible for drug and arms trafficking operations between Latin America and Europe was captured in Guernica, Buenos Aires after years-long of manhunt.

Australia

Known by the name "The Honoured Society," the 'Ndrangheta controlled Italian-Australian organized crime all along the east coast of Australia since the early 20th century. 'Ndrangheta operating in Australia include the Sergi, Barbaro and Papalia clans. Similarly in Victoria the major families are named as Italiano, Arena, Muratore, Benvenuto, and Condello. In the 1960s warfare among 'Ndrangheta clans broke out over the control of the Victoria Market in Melbourne, where an estimated $45 million worth of fruits and vegetables passed through each year. After the death of Domenico Italiano, known as Il Papa, different clans tried to gain control over the produce market. At the time it was unclear that most involved were affiliated with the 'Ndrangheta.L'ascesa della 'Ndrangheta in Australia , by Pierluigi Spagnolo, Altreitalie, January–June 2010

The 'Ndrangheta began in Australia in Queensland, where they continued their form of rural organised crime, especially in the fruit and vegetable industry. After the 1998–2006 Melbourne gangland killings which included the murder of 'Ndrangheta Godfather Frank Benvenuto. In 2008, the 'Ndrangheta were tied to the importation of 15 million ecstasy pills to Melbourne, at the time the world's largest ecstasy haul. The pills were hidden in a container-load of tomato cans from Calabria. Australian 'Ndrangheta boss Pasquale Barbaro was arrested. Pasquale Barbaro's father Francesco Barbaro was a boss throughout the 1970s and early 1980s until his retirement. Several of the Barbaro clan, including among others, Francesco, were suspected in orchestrating the murder of Australian businessman Donald Mackay in July 1977 for his anti-drugs campaign.

Italian authorities believe that former Western Australian mayor of the city of Stirling, Tony Vallelonga, is an associate of Giuseppe Commisso, boss of the Siderno clan of the Ndrangheta. In 2009, Italian police overheard the two discussing Ndrangheta activities. Since migrating from Italy to Australia in 1963, Vallelonga has "established a long career in grass-roots politics."

The 'Ndrangheta are also tied to large cocaine imports. Up to 500 kilograms of cocaine was documented relating to the mafia and Australian associates smuggled in slabs of marble, plastic tubes and canned tuna, coming from South America to Melbourne via Italy between 2002 and 2004. A report in 2016 by Vice Media indicated that the activities continued to be profitable: "Between 2004 and 2014, the gang's members amassed more than $10 million [$7.6 million USD] in real estate and race horses in Victoria alone pouring money into wholesalers, cafes, and restaurants".

A June 2015 report by BBC News discussed an investigation by Fairfax Media and 
Four Corners which alleged that "the 'Ndrangheta, runs a drugs and extortion business worth billions of euros" in Australia and that "politicians have been infiltrated by the Calabrian mafia".

In February 2020, two individuals, said to be "multimillionaire fruit and vegetable kings" were alleged to be 'Ndrangheta "capos", having a relationship with the "secretive criminal organisation". The Sydney Morning Herald report specified that the two "are not accused of any crime in either Italy or Australia". The alleged information was obtained during investigations of other individuals during Operation Eyphemos in Calabria, which "led to the arrest ... of 65 men for alleged mafia activities including extortion and political corruption in Calabria".

Belgium
'Ndrangheta clans purchased almost "an entire neighbourhood" in Brussels with laundered money originating from drug trafficking. On 5 March 2004, 47 people were arrested, accused of drug trafficking and money laundering to purchase real estate in Brussels for some 28 million euros. The activities extended to the Netherlands where large quantities of heroin and cocaine had been purchased by the Pesce-Bellocco clan from Rosarno and the Strangio clan from San Luca. La mafia calabraise recycle à Bruxelles , La Libre Belgique, 6 March 2004.

Brazil
Forces of the Brazilian Polícia Federal have linked illegal drug trading activities in Brazil to 'Ndragheta in operation Monte Pollino, which disassembled cocaine exportation schemes to Europe.

Several important 'Ndrangheta bosses were arrested in Brazil, such as Domenico Pelle, Nicola Assisi and Rocco Morabito.

Assisi and Morabito (according to investigations by the Brazilian Federal Police) resided in Brazil, where they pretended to be legitimate businessmen and lived in luxury properties, while negotiating with important members of the Primeiro Comando da Capital (considered the largest criminal syndicate in Brazil and one of the most powerful and violent drug cartels in the world) agreements to ship and exporting large shipments of cocaine to Europe.

Canada

According to a May 2018 news report, "Siderno's Old World 'Ndrangheta boss sent acolytes to populate the New World" including Michele (Mike) Racco who settled in Toronto in 1952, followed by other mob families. By 2010, investigators in Italy said that Toronto's 'Ndrangheta had climbed "to the top of the criminal world" with "an unbreakable umbilical cord" to Calabria. In the 2018 book, The Good Mothers: The True Story of the Women Who Took on the World's Most Powerful Mafia, Alex Perry reports that the Calabrian 'Ndrangheta has, for the past decade, been replacing the Sicilian Cosa Nostra as the primary drug traffickers in North America.

During a 2018 trial in Toronto, ex-mobster Carmine Guido told the court that the 'Ndrangheta is a collection of family-based clans, each with its own boss, working within a uniform structure and under board of control.

The Canadian 'Ndrangheta is believed to be involved in various activities including the smuggling of unlicensed tobacco products through ties with criminal elements in cross-border Native American tribes. According to Alberto Cisterna of the Italian National Anti-Mafia Directorate, the 'Ndrangheta has a heavy presence in Canada. "There is a massive number of their people in North America, especially in Toronto. And for two reasons. The first is linked to the banking system. Canada's banking system is very secretive; it does not allow investigation. So Canada is the ideal place to launder money. The second reason is to smuggle drugs." The 'Ndrangheta have found Canada a useful North American entry point. The organization used extortion, loan sharking, theft, electoral crimes, mortgage and bank fraud, crimes of violence and cocaine trafficking.

A Canadian branch labelled the Siderno Group – because its members primarily came from the Ionian coastal town of Siderno in Calabria – is the one discussed earlier. It has been active in Canada since the 1950s, originally formed by Michele (Mike) Racco who was the head of the Group until his death in 1980. Siderno is also home to one of the 'Ndrangheta's biggest and most important clans, heavily involved in the global cocaine business and money laundering. Antonio Commisso, the alleged leader of the Siderno group, is reported to lead efforts to import "... illicit arms, explosives and drugs ..." Elements of 'Ndrangheta have been reported to have been present in Hamilton, Ontario as early as 1911. Historical crime families in the Hamilton area include the Musitanos, Luppinos and Papalias.

According to an agreed Statement of Fact filed with the court, "the Locali [local cells] outside of Calabria replicate the structure from Calabria, and are connected to their mother-Locali in Calabria. The authority to start Locali outside Calabria comes from the governing bodies of the organization in Calabria. The Locali outside of Calabria are part of the same 'Ndrangheta organization as in Calabria, and maintain close relationships with the Locali where its members come from." The group's activities in the Greater Toronto Area were controlled by a group known as the 'Camera di Controllo' which "makes all of the final decisions", according to the witness' testimony. It consists of six or seven Toronto-area men, who co-ordinate activities and resolves disputes among Calabrian gangsters in Southern Ontario. In 1962, Racco established a crimini or Camera di Controllo in Canada with the help of Giacomo Luppino and Rocco Zito.Schneider, Iced: The Story of Organized Crime in Canada, pp. 310 One of the members was Giuseppe Coluccio, before he was arrested and extradited to Italy. Other members are Vincenzo DeMaria,Police lose track of alleged soldier in the mob, until Canadian Tire tussle, National Post, 17 February 2011 Carmine Verduci before his death, and Cosimo Stalteri before his death. In August 2015, the Immigration and Refugee Board of Canada (IRB) issued a deportation order for Carmelo Bruzzese. Bruzzese appealed the decision to Canada's Federal Court, but it was rejected, and on 2 October 2015, Bruzzese was escorted onto a plane in Toronto, landing in Rome, where he was arrested by Italian police. Major Giuseppe De Felice, a commander with the Carabinieri, told the IRB that Bruzzese "assumed the most important roles and decisions. He gave the orders."

After living in Richmond Hill, Ontario for five years until 2010, Antonio Coluccio was one of 29 people named in arrest warrants in Italy in September 2014. Police said they were part of the Commisso 'ndrina ('Ndrangheta) crime family in Siderno. In July 2018, Coluccio was sentenced to 30 years in prison for corruption. His two brothers, including Salvatore and Giuseppe Coluccio, were already in prison due to Mafia-related convictions.

In June 2018, Cosimo Ernesto Commisso, of Woodbridge, Ontario and an unrelated woman were shot and killed in his vehicle whilst outside his home. According to sources contacted by the Toronto Star, "Commisso was related to Cosimo "The Quail" Commisso of Siderno, Italy, who has had relations in Ontario, is considered by police to be a "'Ndrangheta organized crime boss". The National Post reported that Cosimo Ernesto Commisso, while not a known criminal, "shares a name and family ties with a man who has for decades been reputed to be a Mafia leader in the Toronto area". The cousin of "The Quail", Antonio Commisso, was on the list of most wanted fugitives in Italy until his capture on 28 June 2005, in Woodbridge.

In June 2015, RCMP led police raids across the Greater Toronto Area, named Project OPhoenix, which resulted in the arrest of 19 men, allegedly affiliated with the 'Ndrangheta. In March 2018, during the resultant criminal trial north of Toronto, the court heard from a Carabinieri lieutenant-colonel that 'Ndrangheta is active in Germany, Australia and the Greater Toronto Area. "People in Italy have to be responsible for their representatives here but the final word comes from Italy". A member of the Greater Toronto Area's 'Ndrangheta cell, Carmine Guido, who had been a police informant, testified at length in 2018 about the structure and activities of the organization which had been under the control of Italian-born Bradford, Ontario resident, Giuseppe (Pino) Ursino and Romanian-born Cosmin (Chris) Dracea of Toronto. The latter two faced two counts of cocaine trafficking for the benefit of a criminal organization and one charge of conspiracy to commit an indictable offence. Guido was paid $2.4 million by the Royal Canadian Mounted Police between 2013 and 2015 to secretly tape dozens of conversations with suspected 'Ndrangheta members.Crown calling for lengthy prison sentences in GTA Mafia drug-importing trial , Toronto Star, 9 January 2019 In February 2019, Ursino was sentenced to 11 and a half years in prison on drug trafficking charges, with Dracea sentenced to nine years in prison on cocaine trafficking conspiracy. Neither had a previous criminal record. At the sentencing, the presiding judge made this comment: "Based on the evidence at trial, Giuseppe Ursino is a high-ranking member of the 'Ndrangheta who orchestrated criminal conduct and then stepped back to lessen his potential implication" ... Cosmin Dracea knew he was dealing with members of a criminal organization when he conspired to import cocaine".

During the Ursino/Dracea trial, an Italian police expert testified that the 'Ndrangheta operated in the Greater Toronto Area and in Thunder Bay particularly in drug trafficking, extortion, loan sharking, theft of public funds, robbery, fraud, electoral crimes and crimes of violence. After the trial, Tom Andreopoulos, deputy chief federal prosecutor, said that this was the first time in Canada that the 'Ndrangheta was targeted as an organized crime group since 1997, when the Criminal Code was amended to include the offence of criminal organization. He offered this comment about the organization:"We're talking about structured organized crime. We're talking about a political entity, almost; a culture of crime that colonizes across the sea from Italy to Canada. This is one of the most sophisticated criminal organizations in the world."

In June 2018, a Mafia expert wrote that "A new alliance between Bonanno associates and the Violi family . . . is significant, as it suggests a growing prominence for Calabrian mafia – the 'Ndrangheta – within the New York families and in Canada". Criminologist Anna Sergi of the University of Essex added that drug trafficking was the most active pursuit in North America.

On 18 July 2019, the York Regional Police announced the largest organized crime bust in Ontario, part of an 18-month long operation called Project Sindicato that was also coordinated with the Italian State Police. York Regional Police had arrested 15 people in Canada, 12 people in Calabria, and seized $35 million worth of homes, sports cars and cash in a major trans-Atlantic probe targeting the most prominent wing of the 'Ndrangheta in Canada headed by Angelo Figliomeni. On 14 and 15 July, approximately 500 officers raided 48 homes and businesses across the GTA, seizing 27 homes worth $24 million, 23 cars, including five Ferraris, and $2 million in cash and jewelry. Nine of the 15 arrests in Canada included major crime figures: Angelo Figliomeni, Vito Sili, Nick Martino, Emilio Zannuti, Erica Quintal, Salvatore Oliveti, Giuseppe Ciurleo, Rafael Lepore and Francesco Vitucci. The charges laid included tax evasion, money laundering, defrauding the government and participating in a criminal organization.

During a press conference in Vaughan, Ontario, Fausto Lamparelli of the Italian State Police, offered this comment about the relationship between the 'Ndrangheta in Ontario and Calabria:"This investigation allowed us to learn something new. The 'Ndrangheta crime families in Canada are able to operate autonomously, without asking permission or seeking direction from Italy. Traditionally, 'Ndrangheta clans around the world are all subservient to the mother ship in Calabria. It suggests the power and influence the Canadian-based clans have built."

On 9 August 2019, as part of the same joint investigation, several former Greater Toronto Area residents were arrested in Calabria, including Giuseppe DeMaria, Francesco Commisso, Rocco Remo Commisso, Antonio Figliomeni and Cosimo Figiomeni. Vincenzo Muià had visited Toronto on 31 March 2019 to meet with Angelo and Cosimo Figliomeni, seeking answers to who had ambushed and killed his brother, Carmelo Muià, in Siderno on 18 January 2018; Muià's smartphone was unwittingly and secretly transmitting his closed-door conversations to authorities in Italy.

In 2020, the charges laid against three individuals as a result of Project Sindicato were "stayed" (the prosecution discontinued), unless the prosecutors could find new evidence and proceeded with the charges again within one year. In January 2021, the charges against the remaining six were also stayed, including that of Angelo Figliomeni, "the head of the 'Ndrangheta in Toronto" according to York Regional Police. The charges were stayed after an investigation "into the use of the privileged conversations" that found "improper use of wiretapping" and "significant breaches of solicitor-client privilege". All property seized by police must now be returned — with the exception of illegal possessions.

Colombia
The 'Ndrangheta clans were closely associated with the AUC paramilitary groups led by Salvatore Mancuso, a son of Italian immigrants; he surrendered to Álvaro Uribe's government to avoid extradition to the U.S. According to Giuseppe Lumia of the Italian Parliamentary Antimafia Commission, 'Ndrangheta clans are actively involved in the production of cocaine.  The Mancuso 'ndrina is a powerful 'Ndrangheta family.

Germany
According to a study by the German foreign intelligence service, the Bundesnachrichtendienst (BND), 'Ndrangheta groups are using Germany to invest cash from drugs and weapons smuggling. Profits are invested in hotels, restaurants and houses, especially along the Baltic coast and in the eastern German states of Thuringia and Saxony. "Mafia setzt sich in Deutschland fest"  ("Mafia sets firmly in Germany"), Berliner Zeitung, 11 November 2006. Investigators believe that the mafia's bases in Germany are used primarily for clandestine financial transactions. In 1999, the state Office of Criminal Investigation in Stuttgart investigated an Italian from San Luca who had allegedly laundered millions through a local bank, the Sparkasse Ulm. The man claimed that he managed a profitable car dealership, and authorities were unable to prove that the business was not the source of his money. The Bundeskriminalamt (BKA) concluded in 2000 that "the activities of this 'Ndrangheta clan represent a multi-regional criminal phenomenon." In 2009, a confidential report by the BKA said some 229 'Ndrangheta families were living in Germany, and were involved in gun-running, money laundering, drug-dealing, and racketeering, as well as legal businesses. Some 900 people were involved in criminal activity, and were also legal owners of hundreds of restaurants, as well as being major players in the property market in the former East. The most represented 'Ndrangheta family originated from the city of San Luca (Italy), with some 200 members in Germany. "Italienische Mafia wird in Deutschland heimisch"  ("Italian Mafia makes home in Germany"), Die Zeit, 12 August 2009. A war between the two 'Ndrangheta clans Pelle-Romeo (Pelle-Vottari) and Strangio-Nirta from San Luca that had started in 1991 and resulted in several deaths spilled into Germany in 2007; six men were shot to death in front of an Italian restaurant in Duisburg on 15 August 2007."How the tentacles of the Calabrian Mafia spread from Italy" , Times Online, 15 August 2007. (See San Luca feud.) According to the head of the German federal police service, Joerg Ziercke, "Half of the criminal groups identified in Germany belong to the 'Ndrangheta. It has been the biggest criminal group since the 1980s. Compared to other groups operating in Germany, the Italians have the strongest organization."

Netherlands
 allegedly lived for 10 years in the Netherlands, where he managed his contacts with Colombian cocaine cartels. He was arrested in Amsterdam on 27 October 2005. "'Ndrangheta, estradato dall'Olanda il boss Sebastiano Strangio" , La Repubblica, 27 March 2006. The seaports of Rotterdam and Amsterdam are used to import cocaine. The Giorgi, Nirta and Strangio clans from San Luca have a base in the Netherlands and Brussels (Belgium). In March 2012, the head of the Dutch National Crime Squad (Dienst Nationale Recherche, DNR) stated that the DNR will team up with the Tax and Customs Administration and the Fiscal Information and Investigation Service to combat the 'Ndrangheta.

Malta
David Gonzi, a son of former Prime Minister of Malta Lawrence Gonzi, was accused of illegal activities by acting as a trustee shareholder in a gaming company. The company in question was operated by a Calabrian associate of the 'Ndrangheta in Malta. His name appeared several times on an investigation document of over 750 pages that was commissioned by the tribunal of the Reggio Calabria. Gonzi called the document unprofessional. A European arrest warrant was published for Gonzi to appear at the tribunal but this never materialised. Gonzi, however, was completely exonerated from the list of potential suspects in the 'Ndrangheta gaming bust.

After investigation of the presence of the 'Ndrangheta, 21 gaming outlets had their operation license temporarily suspended in Malta due to irregularities in a period of one year.Balzan, Jurden (2 August 2015), "David Gonzi brushes off European arrest warrant threat" , Malta Today,

In a Notice of the Conclusion of the Investigation dated 30 June 2016, criminal action was commenced in Italy against 113 persons originally mentioned in the investigation.

Slovakia

In February 2018, Slovak investigative journalist Ján Kuciak was shot dead at his home together with his fiancée. At the time of his murder, Kuciak was working on a report about Slovak connections with the 'Ndrangheta. He had previously reported on organized tax fraud involving businesspeople close to the ruling Smer-SD party. On 28 February, Aktuality.sk published Kuciak's last, unfinished story. The article details the activities of Italian businessmen with ties to organised crime who have settled in eastern Slovakia, and have spent years embezzling European Union funds intended for the development of this relatively poor region, as well as their connections to high-ranking state officials, such as Viliam Jasaň, a deputy and the Secretary of the State Security Council of Slovakia, and Mária Trošková, a former nude model who became Chief Adviser of Prime Minister Robert Fico. Both Jasaň and Trošková took leave of absence on the same day, stating that they would return to their positions once the investigations were concluded.

Switzerland
The crime syndicate has a significant presence in Switzerland since the early 1970s but has operated there with little scrutiny due to the inconspicuous life styles of their members, the Swiss legal landscape, and solid foundations in local businesses. In the aftermath of the San Luca feud in 2007 and subsequent arrests in Italy (Operation "Crimine"), it became clear that the group had also infiltrated the economically proliferous regions of Switzerland and Southern Germany. In March 2016, Swiss law enforcement in cooperation with Italian state prosecutors arrested a total of 15 individuals, 13 in the city of Frauenfeld, 2 in the canton of Valais, accusing them of active membership to an organized crime syndicate also known as "Operazione Helvetica". Since 2015, the Swiss federal police has conducted undercover surveillance and recorded the group's meetings in a restaurant establishment in a small village just outside of Frauenfeld. The meetings were taking place in a relatively remote location using the now defunct entity the "Wängi Boccia Club" as its cover. According to the Italian prosecutor Antonio De Bernardo, there are several cells operating within the jurisdiction of the Swiss Federation, estimating the number of operatives per cell to about 40, and a couple of 100 in total. All of the arrested persons are Italian citizens, the two men arrested in the Valais have already been extradited to Italy, and as of August 2016, one individual arrested in Frauenfeld has been approved for extradition to Italy.

United Kingdom
In London, the Aracri and Fazzari clans are thought to be active in money laundering, catering and drug trafficking.

United States
The earliest evidence of 'Ndrangheta activity in the U.S. points to an intimidation scheme run by the syndicate in Pennsylvania mining towns; this scheme was unearthed in 1906. Current 'Ndrangheta activities in the United States mainly involve drug trafficking, arms smuggling, and money laundering. It is known that the 'Ndrangheta branches in North America have been associating with Italian-American organized crime. The Suraci family from Reggio Calabria has moved some of its operations to the U.S. The family was founded by Giuseppe Suraci who has been in the United States since 1962. His younger cousin, Antonio Rogliano
runs the family in Calabria. On Tuesday, 11 February 2014, both FBI and Italian Police intercepted the transatlantic network of U.S. and Italian crime families. The raid targeted the Gambino and Bonanno families in the U.S. while in Italy, it targeted the Ursino  'ndrina from Gioiosa Jonica. The defendants were charged with drug trafficking, money laundering and firearms offenses, based, in part, on their participation in a transnational heroin and cocaine trafficking conspiracy involving the 'Ndrangheta. The operation began in 2012 when investigators detected a plan by members of the Ursino clan of the 'Ndrangheta to smuggle large amounts of drugs. An undercover agent was dispatched to Italy and was successful in infiltrating the clan. An undercover agent was also involved in the handover of 1.3 kg of heroin in New York as part of the infiltration operation.

In June 2018, a Mafia expert wrote that "A new alliance between Bonanno associates and the Violi family . . . is significant, as it suggests a growing prominence for Calabrian mafia – the 'Ndrangheta – within the New York families and in Canada". Criminologist Anna Sergi of the University of Essex added that drug trafficking was the most active pursuit in North America.

Uruguay
On 24 June 2019, 'Ndrangheta leader Rocco Morabito, dubbed the "cocaine king of Milan", escaped from Central Prison in Montevideo alongside three other inmates, escaping "through a hole in the roof of the building". Morabito was awaiting extradition to Italy for international drug trafficking, having been arrested at a Montevideo hotel in 2017 after living in Punta del Este under a false name for 13 years.

 In popular culture 
Beginning in 2000, music producer  released three CD compilations of Italian mafia folk songs over a five-year period. The 2013 book ZeroZeroZero by Roberto Saviano investigates the activities of the 'Ndrangheta in Italy. Stefano Sollima adapted the book into a 2020 TV series of the same name. 
 2023 - An Italian-language TV series depicting 'Ndrangheta, titled The Good Mothers based on the novel of the same name by British author Alex Perry had its premiere on 73rd Berlin International Film Festival in Berlinale Series on 21 February 2023.

 See also 

 List of 'ndrine
 List of most wanted fugitives in Italy
 List of members of the 'Ndrangheta
 Museo della ndrangheta
 Toxic waste dumping by the 'Ndrangheta
 Camorra
 Sicilian Mafia
 Sacra Corona Unita

Notes

References

 Behan, Tom (1996). The Camorra , London: Routledge, 
 Dickie, John (2013). Mafia Republic: Italy's Criminal Curse. Cosa Nostra, 'Ndrangheta and Camorra from 1946 to the Present , London: Hodder & Stoughton, 
 Gratteri, Nicola & Antonio Nicaso (2006). Fratelli di sangue , Cosenza: Pellegrini Editore,  
 Paoli, Letizia (2003). Mafia Brotherhoods: Organized Crime, Italian Style , New York: Oxford University Press  (Review  by Klaus Von Lampe) (Review by Alexandra V. Orlova)
 Truzzolillo, Fabio. "The 'Ndrangheta: the current state of historical research," Modern Italy (August 2011) 16#3 pp. 363–383.
 Varese, Federico. "How Mafias Migrate: The Case of the 'Ndrangheta in Northern Italy." Law & Society Review'', June 2006.
 

Calabrian society
 
Organized crime groups in Argentina
Organised crime groups in Australia
Organised crime groups in Belgium
Organized crime groups in Brazil
Organized crime groups in Canada
Organized crime groups in France
Organised crime groups in Germany
Organised crime groups in Italy
Organised crime gangs of London
Organized crime groups in Mexico
Organised crime groups in the Netherlands
Organized crime groups in Slovakia
Organised crime groups in Spain
Organized crime groups in Switzerland
Organized crime groups in the United States
Secret societies related to organized crime
Transnational organized crime
Mexican drug war